The Royal Spanish Football Federation (RFEF) is the governing body of football in Spain. It is based in La Ciudad del Fútbol of Las Rozas, a municipality near Madrid. It was founded on 14 October 1909 as Federación Española de Clubs de Football, and officially founded on 29 September 1913.

It administers the competition committee (including the handling of the trophy) of the Campeonato Nacional de Liga: the Primera División and the Segunda División, even though they are organized by LaLiga. It organizes the Primera División RFEF, the Segunda División RFEF and the Tercera División RFEF.

It is also responsible for appointing the management of the men's, women's, and youth national football teams. The Spain national futsal team, also belongs to the federation. , the federation has 29,205 registered clubs and 1,074,567 federated football players.

History

Early history
It was founded on 14 October 1909 as the Federación Española de Clubs de Football (FECF) was established in Madrid on 14 October 1909, serving as the forerunner of the current "Royal Spanish Football Federation" (RFEF) founded four years later. Some of the first clubs to join this original federation were FC Barcelona, Club Español de Madrid, Sociedad Gimnástica, the Irún Sporting Club, Fortuna de Vigo and Sporting de Vigo. However, other clubs did not recognize the new organization as a single national federation, including relevant entities such as Madrid FC and Athletic Club and the current national champion, Club Ciclista de San Sebastián, and this caused the 1910 Copa del Rey to have two parallel rival cup competitions: an "official", organized by the newly created FECF, in Madrid, won by Barcelona, and an "unofficial", organized by the UECF (Unión Española de Clubes de Fútbol), in San Sebastián, won by Athletic. Both are currently recognized as official by the RFEF.

The discussions to decide the venue of the 1913 Copa del Rey ended up causing another split, with Barcelona and España de Barcelona announcing their departure in the assembly held in May 1912, along with the Gipuzkoan clubs of Real Sociedad and Vasconia, and on 29 November 1912, these clubs founded the "Spanish Union of Football Clubs" (UECF) in San Sebastián, and again two parallel tournaments were held.

Both the Spanish Federation of Clubs (FECF) and the Spanish Union of Clubs (UECF), tried to become the representatives of Spanish football. Both organizations had a monarch as parents, them being Queen Victoria Eugenia (leading a tournament of the Union of Clubs) and King Alfonso XIII (honorary president of the Federation). In addition, the UECF tried to get closer to FIFA by holding an international match against a French championship team, held on 25 May 1913 at the Amute in Hondarribia. José Berraondo performed the functions of the Spanish coach and refereed the match. The game ended in a 1–1 draw with Spain's goalscorer being the captain Juan Arzuaga. This meeting led the FIFA president, the Englishman Daniel Burley Woolfall, to contact Carlos Padrós, then the greatest benefactor of Spanish football and former president of Real Madrid. Padrós had already signed a petition for the unification of both organizations, but the Spanish clubs refused to do so, and thus, on 31 May 1913, FIFA rejected the entry of Spanish football, by not accepting the coexistence of two federations. When this situation reached the ears of King Alfonso XIII, he told Juan Padrós, the president of the FECF Federation, that he would never admit any other organization other than the one of which he was honorary president. Juan Padrós informed Enrique Pariñas, the president of the Union of Clubs, about the King's position that marginalized the Union of Clubs, while Carlos informed the president of FIFA. Finally, at the behest of the monarch, both federations agreed to their definitive union. A new board of directors was then created and Ricardo Ruiz de Ferry (sports journalist) was elected president, with General Adolfo Meléndez and Antonio Bernabéu, as vice president and secretary, respectively.

Foundation
In a historic meeting held on 30 July 1913 in San Sebastián, the new board of directors informed the King that the union of Spanish football had been achieved, and in turn the king granted the title of "Royal" to the Federation, which has since held the title and name of "Royal Spanish Football Federation". At this meeting the constitution of four regional federations (east, west, north and center) was also approved. The RFEF was officially established on 29 September 1913, with Francisco García Molina being elected as the first president of the new body, and in that same day, Molina was accepted as a provisional member of FIFA, formalizing the federation's full entry into FIFA at the assembly held in Oslo on 27 July 1914.

In order to put an end to the disputes that had marked the last editions of the Copa del Rey, it was agreed, among other measures, to form a championship for each regional federation (the country was divided into ten regions), which would serve as the qualifying stages for the tournament. The 1914 Copa del Rey was the first edition of the competition to be organized by the RFEF, and Athletic Club were the winners after beating FC Espanya 2–1 in the final. After their foundation in September 1913, one of the first initiatives taken by the Royal Spanish Football Federation was to promote an inter-regional championship that would serve as the first major "showcase" of Spanish football, and consequently, as the bases for the formation of a Spanish team that could compete with other international teams; and thus, in 1915, they launched the Prince of Asturias Cup, which was sponsored by King Alfonso XIII, who donated the trophy which his son, Alfonso, Prince of Asturias, had to deliver, hence the name of the tournament.

National team
On 21 May 1920, the General Assembly of the RFEF approved the creation of the national team to participate in the 1920 Antwerp Olympic Games. A committee of selectors made up of Paco Bru (representing the Catalonia region), José Angel Berraondo (from the North region) and Julián Ruete (from the Center region) was appointed, although the latter two ultimately resigned for personal reasons, and Luis Argüello (Treasurer of the Federation) joined the expedition.

On 28 August 1920, the first official match of the Spanish national team was played, held at the La Butte stadium (now Joseph Marien Stadium) in Brussels, in front of some 3,000 spectators. Spain wore a red shirt, white shorts, black socks and an embroidered lion on the chest. The match ended with a 1-0 victory against Denmark, with a goal from Gipuzkoan Patricio Arabolaza in the 54th minute. In their maiden international tournament, Spain returned from Belgian lands with the silver medal after beating the Netherlands in the decisive match.

La Liga
On 30 June 1926 , after a long process, the clubs approved the first "Spanish Professional Football Regulations", thus, following the English model, the sport of football become professional in Spain. This would lay the foundation for the founding of the National League Championship (La Liga) in 1929.

The first edition of La Liga ran from February to June 1929, and was played by ten clubs. Six clubs were selected for being Copa del Rey winners (Real Madrid, Barcelona, Athletic Bilbao, Arenas Club, Real Unión and Real Sociedad —as the successor club of the Club Ciclista), another three as runners-up (Atlético Madrid, RCD Espanyol and CE Europa), and to decide the tenth place, an eliminatory tournament between ten clubs was organized, which Racing de Santander won after beating Sevilla in the decisive match. Barcelona was proclaimed champion of the first league edition with 25 points, closely followed by Real Madrid at 23.

Competitions

The RFEF also organizes several competitions:
 Men's Competitions:
 Primera División RFEF
 Segunda División RFEF
 Tercera División RFEF
 Copa de S.M. el Rey
 Supercopa de España
 Copa Federación
 Women's competitions:
 Primera Federación FutFem
 Segunda Federación FutFem
 Primera Nacional FutFem
 Copa de S.M. la Reina
 Supercopa de España Femenina
 Youth competitions:
 Copa de Campeones Juvenil
 Copa del Rey Juvenil
 División de Honor Juvenil
 Liga Nacional Juvenil

Honours

National football team

National youth teams

National futsal team

Territories

The RFEF consists of 19 regional and territorial federations, comprising the different Autonomous communities and cities in Spain.

 Andalusia: Real Federación Andaluza de Fútbol
 Aragon: Federación Aragonesa de Fútbol
 Asturias: Real Federación de Fútbol del Principado de Asturias
 Balearic Islands: Federación de Fútbol de las Islas Baleares / Federació de Futbol de les Illes Balears
 Basque Country: Federación Vasca de Fútbol / Euskadiko Futbol Federakundea
 Álava: Federación Alavesa de Fútbol / Arabako Futbol Federakundea
 Biscay: Federación Vizcaína de Fútbol / Bizkaiko Futbol Federakundea
 Gipuzkoa: Federación Guipuzcoana de Fútbol / Gipuzkoako Futbol Federazioa
 Canary Islands: Federación Canaria de Fútbol
 Las Palmas: Federación Interinsular de Fútbol de Las Palmas
 Santa Cruz de Tenerife: Federación Interinsular de Fútbol de Tenerife
 Cantabria: Federación Cántabra de Fútbol
 Castile and León: Federación de Castilla y León de Fútbol
 Castilla–La Mancha: Federación de Fútbol de Castilla-La Mancha
 Catalonia: Federación Catalana de Fútbol / Federació Catalana de Futbol
 Ceuta: Federación de Fútbol de Ceuta
 Community of Madrid: Real Federación de Fútbol de Madrid
 Extremadura: Federación Extremeña de Fútbol
 Galicia: Real Federación Gallega de Fútbol / Real Federación Galega de Fútbol
 La Rioja: Federación Riojana de Fútbol 
 Melilla: Real Federación Melillense de Fútbol
 Region of Murcia: Federación de Fútbol de la Región de Murcia
 Navarre: Federación Navarra de Fútbol / Nafarroako Futbol Federazioa
 Valencian Community: Federación de Fútbol de la Comunidad Valenciana / Federació de Futbol de la Comunitat Valenciana

Presidents

References

External links

Official website RFEF 
Spain at FIFA site
Spain at UEFA site

 
Spain
Football
 
1909 establishments in Spain
Sports organizations established in 1909
Organisations based in Spain with royal patronage